Sportsklubben Frem-31 is a Norwegian sports club from Lysaker, Bærum which was founded on 23 January 1931. The club has sections for bandy, association football and handball.

The men's bandy team last played in the Premier League in the 1996–97 season.

External links
Official site 

Bandy clubs in Norway
Football clubs in Norway
Sport in Bærum
Association football clubs established in 1931
Bandy clubs established in 1931
1931 establishments in Norway